The 2003 Taça de Angola was the 22nd edition of the Taça de Angola, the second most important and the top knock-out football club competition following the Girabola. Interclube beat Sagrada Esperança 1-0 in the final to secure its second title.

The winner qualified to the 2004 CAF Confederation Cup.

Stadiums and locations

Championship bracket
The knockout rounds were played according to the following schedule:
 June 8 - preliminary rounds
 Jul 9 - 10: Round of 16
 Aug 23 - Sep 3: Quarter-finals
 Nov 8 / 9: Semi-finals
 Nov 11: Final

Preliminary rounds

1/16 finals

Quarter-finals

Semi-finals

Final

See also
 2003 Girabola
 2004 Angola Super Cup
 2004 CAF Confederation Cup
 Interclube players
 Sagrada Esperança players

External links
 profile at rsssf.com

References

Angola Cup
2003 in Angolan football
Angola